Chapman may refer to:

Businesses
 Chapman Entertainment, a former British television production company
 Chapman Guitars, a guitar company established in 2009 by Rob Chapman
 Chapman's, a Canadian ice cream and ice water products manufacturer
 Chapman & Hall, a former British publishing house

People and fictional characters 
 Chapman (surname), including a list of people and fictional characters
 Chapman Mortimer, pen name of Scottish novelist William Charles Chapman Mortimer (1907–1988)
 Chapman To, Hong Kong actor born Edward Ng Cheuk-cheung in 1972
 Chapman (occupation), itinerant dealers or hawkers in early modern Britain

Places

Antarctica
 Chapman Glacier (Palmer Land)
 Chapman Glacier (Victoria Land)
 Chapman Hump, a nunatak in Palmer Land
 Chapman Nunatak, Mac. Robertson Land
 Chapman Rocks, Hero Bay, South Shetland Islands

Australia
 Chapman, Australian Capital Territory, a suburb of Canberra
 Chapman River, a river in the Mid-West region of Western Australia

Canada
 Chapman Settlement, Nova Scotia
 Chapman Islands, Nunavut

South Africa
Chapman's Peak, a mountain on the western side of the Cape Peninsula

United States
 Chapman, Alabama, an unincorporated community
 Chapman, Pasadena, California, a neighborhood of Pasadena
 Chapman, Illinois, an unincorporated community
 Chapman, Kansas, a city
 Chapman, Maine, a town
 Chapman State Park (Maryland)
 Chapman, Montana, an unincorporated community
 Chapman, Nebraska, a village
 Chapman, Ohio, an unincorporated community
 Chapman, Pennsylvania, a borough
 Chapman State Park, Pennsylvania
 Chapman Creek, Pennsylvania
 Chapman Run, Pennsylvania, a stream
 Chapman, West Virginia, an unincorporated community
 Chapman Bay, a body of water in Washington
 Mount Chapman, on the Tennessee-North Carolina border
 Chapman Avenue, a street in Orange County, California

Antarctica, Canada and the United States
 Chapman Lake (disambiguation), also includes Lake Chapman
 Chapman Township (disambiguation)

Schools and school buildings in the United States
 Chapman University, a private university in Orange County, California
 Chapman Hall, a building on the University of Oregon campus
 Chapman High School (Kansas)
 Chapman High School (Inman, South Carolina)
 Chapman School of Seamanship, Stuart, Florida

Science
 2409 Chapman, a main belt asteroid
 Chapman (crater), a lunar crater
 Chapman Medal, a Royal Astronomical Society award

Ships
 af Chapman (ship), a full-rigged ship in Stockholm, Sweden, now a youth hostel
 Chapman (1777 ship), a British merchant ship
 NOAAS Chapman (R 446), an American fisheries research vessel

Other uses
Chapman Piloting, a boating reference work
 Chapman (magazine), a Scottish literary journal
 Chapman (drink), a non-alcoholic cocktail popular in Nigeria
 Chapman Museum, Glens Falls, New York, United States
 Chapman Aerodrome, Yukon, Canada
 Chapman strut, an automobile suspension device
 Chapman baronets, three titles, one in the Baronetage of Great Britain, one in the Baronetage of Ireland and one in the Baronetage of the United Kingdom
 Chapman Stick, a musical instrument
 Chapman System, a pairs playing format in golf

See also
 
 Chapman code, a 3-letter code used in genealogy
 Chapman function, associated with the absorption integral of the Earth's atmosphere
 Chapman's parakeet, a subspecies of the mitred parakeet
 Chapman's swift, a species of swift in the family Apodidae
 Skelly Field at H. A. Chapman Stadium, University of Tulsa, Oklahoma, United States